The 2004 League of Ireland Premier Division was the 20th season of the League of Ireland Premier Division. The division was made up of 10 teams. Shelbourne were champions while Cork City finished as runners-up. Both clubs also enjoyed respectable runs in Europe.

Overview
The season began on 19 March and ended on 22 November. Each team played four rounds of games, totalling 36 games each. The 2005 season would see the League of Ireland Premier Division revert to 12 twelve teams. To facilitate this expansion there was no promotion/relegation play-off this season and only one team, Dublin City, were automatically relegated. At the end of October, Drogheda United and Bohemians were all but out of the title race. Drogheda United and Bohemians were twelve points and eight points behind leaders Shelbourne respectively. Shelbourne had not quite sealed the title yet, though, as Cork City had reached second place and were just four points behind with four games remaining. On 5 November it looked like the Cork City's league challenge might have been over after they could only draw at home to Derry City. If Shelbourne had beaten Longford Town the following day they would be nine points clear with Cork City having just three games remaining.  Longford won 4–1. Both Cork City and Shelbourne won their remaining games before the final round of matches.  This meant that Cork City were three points behind Shelbourne. Cork had to win and Shelbourne lose for the title to go the Cork instead of Shelbourne.  It turned out that neither result went the way Cork wanted as both they and Shelbourne drew.  This meant that Shelbourne retained the league title and Cork City would have to be satisfied with second place.

Final table

Results

Matches 1–18

Matches 19–36

UEFA coefficient
The League of Ireland Premier Division performances in Europe this season meant that the league received a coefficient of 1.333 added to their overall coefficient which now accumulated to 4.164. This gave them a ranking 38th place as shown.

36.  Iceland
37.  FYR Macedonia
38.  Republic of Ireland
39.  Belarus
40.  Liechtenstein

Top-scorers

Awards 

PFAI eircom League Player of the Year
Jason Byrne - Shelbourne
PFAI eircom League Young Player of the Year
Daryl Murphy - Waterford United

Gallery

See also
 2004 Shelbourne F.C. season
 2004 League of Ireland First Division
 2004 League of Ireland Cup

References

 
1
Ireland
Ireland
1
League of Ireland Premier Division seasons